Robert J. Agler (March 13, 1924 – September 16, 2005) was an American gridiron football player, coach of football and basketball, and college athletics administrator.  He played professionally as a fullback and punter for the Los Angeles Rams of the National Football League (NFL) and the Calgary Stampeders of the Canadian Football League (CFL).  Agler appeared in 16 games for the Rams from 1948 to 1949. With the Stampeders, Agler ran for two touchdowns and kicked 37 punts. Agler served two stints as the head football coach at his alma mater, Otterbein University in Westerville, Ohio, from 1955 to 1965 and 1970 to 1974, compiling a record of 74–63–5. He was also the head basketball coach at Otterbein from 1955 to 1958, tallying a mark of 13–39.

Agler graduated from Dublin High School in Dublin, Ohio in 1941 and then attended Otterbein, where he lettered in football, basketball, baseball, and track. In July 1952, he was hired as the head football coach at Johnstown High School in Johnstown, Ohio. The next year, he returned to Otterbein as an assistant football coach before succeeding Harry W. Ewing as the school's head football coach in 1955.

Head coaching record

Football

References

External links
 
 

1924 births
2005 deaths
American football defensive backs
Canadian football fullbacks
American football halfbacks
American football linebackers
Canadian football punters
Calgary Stampeders players
Los Angeles Rams players
Otterbein Cardinals athletic directors
Otterbein Cardinals baseball players
Otterbein Cardinals football players
Otterbein Cardinals men's basketball coaches
Otterbein Cardinals men's basketball players
College men's track and field athletes in the United States
High school football coaches in Ohio
People from Dublin, Ohio
Players of American football from Columbus, Ohio
Baseball players from Columbus, Ohio
Basketball coaches from Ohio
Basketball players from Columbus, Ohio
Track and field athletes from Ohio
Players of Canadian football from Columbus, Ohio